Mattias Lindström may refer to:

Mattias Lindström (footballer) (born 1980), Swedish football (soccer) player
Mattias Lindström (ice hockey) (born 1991), Swedish ice hockey player